Bishop Rozario Menezes, S.M.M. is the current serving bishop of the Roman Catholic Diocese of Lae, Papua New Guinea.

Early life and education 
He studied psychology and counselling at the International Institute of Integral Human Sciences in Montreal, Canada.

Priesthood 
On 31 May 1992, Rozario became a professed member of the Missionaries of the Company of Mary and was ordained a priest on 4 November 1999.

Episcopate 
Rozario was appointed bishop of Roman Catholic Diocese of Lae on 10 October 2018 by Pope Francis and consecrated by John Ribat on 15 December 2018.

See also 
List of Catholic bishops of India

References

External links 

Living people
1969 births
21st-century Roman Catholic bishops in Papua New Guinea
Bishops appointed by Pope Francis
Roman Catholic bishops of Lae
Indian expatriates in Papua New Guinea
Expatriate bishops